Icy Breasts (also known as Someone Is Bleeding) is a 1974 French-Italian psychological thriller film written and directed by Georges Lautner and starring Alain Delon. It is based on Richard Matheson's 1953 novel Someone Is Bleeding.

Plot

A French widow Peggy, played by Mireille Darc, meets a writer François Rollin, played by Claude Brasseur.
After they meet, François Rollin tries to get romantically involved with Peggy. Peggy turns François down and eventually he stalks her to where she is shopping. François gets into Peggy's car while she was shopping. Peggy finds him in her car asks him to leave but he refuses. Peggy drops him off a few miles down the road. She ends up writing her number on her window. François gets on his motorcycle and shows up at her house. Peggy tells François about being divorced from her husband. When François leaves her home, he is followed by someone. He is asked to speak to Peggy's divorce lawyer, Marc Rilson (Delon). François finds out that Peggy killed her husband and was acquitted for the murder when her lawyer pleaded temporary insanity. Peggy becomes paranoid and kills her bodyguard. Then she ends up staying overnight with François. The following day she returns home to get her belongings. The police were there to ask her questions and took her in for questioning for the murder. She was told not to leave the city without giving notice. They leave to the Turini mountains, followed by Marc. Peggy is in fact mentally ill and on a stop in a hotel room, tries to kill François with a straight razor. Marc arrives and takes her with him. Later, they admire the mountain view and Marc shoots her.

Cast 
 Alain Delon as Marc Rilson
 Mireille Darc as Peggy
 Claude Brasseur as François Rollin
 André Falcon as Commissioner Garnier
 Nicoletta Machiavelli as Mrs. Rilson
  Emilio Messina as Steig
  Fiore Altoviti as Denis Wilson
  Michel Peyrelon as Albert
 Philippe Castelli as The Man in the Underground Parking

Reception
The film received good reviews and was a hit, grossing $250,000 in its first week in Paris. It had 1,462,693 admissions in France.  It played at the second Seattle International Film Festival in 1977.

References

External links

1974 films
Films based on American novels
Films based on crime novels
Films based on works by Richard Matheson
Films directed by Georges Lautner
French psychological thriller films
1970s French-language films
Films set on the French Riviera
Films scored by Philippe Sarde
1970s French films
Italian psychological thriller films
1970s Italian films
1970s psychological thriller films
French-language Italian films